Mitchell Keith "J. J." Anderson (born September 25, 1960) is a retired American professional basketball player in the National Basketball Association (NBA). His position was power forward. He stood at 6'8" and weighed 205 lbs. He lives in Bristol, Wisconsin.

Early career
Before his NBA career he attended Metro High School in Chicago and college at Bradley University from 1978–82. He is one of seven Bradley Braves players to have his jersey number (#11) retired.

NBA
Anderson was selected by the Philadelphia 76ers in the 2nd round (36th overall) of the 1982 NBA Draft. He played for Utah Jazz from 1982 to 1985.

European career
Anderson spent 11 years in Europe. He played one season in Spain (CAI Zaragoza) and Greece. In 1993, he won the European Cup, playing for Aris BC. He also played part of a season in Germany, and eight seasons in Italy, most of them in Florence, becoming a star for all the city.

Notes

External links
Career statistics
European Career statistics

1960 births
Living people
African-American basketball coaches
African-American basketball players
American expatriate basketball people in Canada
American expatriate basketball people in Germany
American expatriate basketball people in Greece
American expatriate basketball people in Italy
American expatriate basketball people in Spain
American men's basketball players
Aris B.C. players
Basketball coaches from Illinois
Basketball players from Chicago
Bradley Braves men's basketball players
CB Zaragoza players
Liga ACB players
Memphis Grizzlies assistant coaches
Pallacanestro Cantù players
Pallalcesto Amatori Udine players
People from Bristol, Kenosha County, Wisconsin
Philadelphia 76ers draft picks
Philadelphia 76ers players
Saski Baskonia players
Small forwards
Utah Jazz players
Vancouver Grizzlies assistant coaches
21st-century African-American people
20th-century African-American sportspeople